Penicillium charlesii is a fungus species of the genus of Penicillium which produces galactocarolose and Citreoviridin.

See also
List of Penicillium species

References

Further reading

 
 
 
 

charlesii
Fungi described in 1933